Amirabad (also Romanized as Amīrābād) is a village in Yateri Rural District, in the Central District of Aradan County, Semnan Province, Iran. At the 2006 census, its population was 14, in 5 families.

References 

Populated places in Aradan County